The Thompson Yates and Johnston Laboratories Report was a journal detailing the research performed by the Thompson Yates Laboratories and the Johnston Laboratories at the University of Liverpool in Liverpool, England.  Previous to the founding of the Johnston Laboratories in 1903 it was simply entitled Thompson Yates Laboratories Report.  It was published by the University of Liverpool Press.

References

External links 

  for Thompson Yates Laboratories Report at WorldCat
  for Thompson Yates and Johnston Laboratories Report at WorldCat
 Volume II (1900) at Google Books
 Volume III, Part II (1900) at Google Books
 Volume III, Part II (1902) at Google Books
 Volume IV, Part II (1902) at Google Books
 Volume V, Part I (1903) at Google Books including coverage of the formal opening of Johnston Laboratories (2nd copy)
 Volume V, Part II (1903) at Google Books
 Volume VI, Part I (1905) at Google Books (2nd copy)

University of Liverpool
Biochemistry journals
Pathology journals